John Singh Gill (born October 28, 1986) is a former American football defensive tackle. He was signed by the Detroit Lions in 2009. He played college football at Northwestern, and started all 4 years, also graduating from Northwestern with a degree in Communications.  He is originally from California and played high school football at Bellarmine College Prep.

Gill played in the NFL for the Indianapolis Colts at defensive tackle and long snapper.  He played in multiple games for the Colts.  He was a member of the team for the 2009 Super Bowl against the New Orleans Saints in Miami.  Gill also played for the Philadelphia Eagles and St. Louis Rams.  After playing in the NFL, Gill moved to the Boston area and started working in software sales.

References

External links
Northwestern Wildcats bio

1986 births
Living people
People from Cupertino, California
Players of American football from California
Sportspeople from Santa Clara County, California
American football defensive tackles
Northwestern Wildcats football players
Detroit Lions players
Indianapolis Colts players
St. Louis Rams players